Gabal Elba ("Mountain Box"), or Elba Mountain, is a peak and, in general, includes the associated mountainous area in the Halaib Triangle of Northeast Africa. Despite being claimed by both Egypt and Sudan, the area is currently under Egyptian control.

Geography

The higher peaks in the area are Gabal Elba itself, Gabal Shellal, Gabal Shendib and Gabal Shendodai.

This phenomenon is registered at its best in the northeast of the region, where Gabal Elba is located, which explains the fact that Gabal Elba receives higher precipitation than other coastal mountains in the range, including higher ones. Aridity gradually increases to the southwest of the area.

Ecology

Gabal Elba's summit is a "mist oasis" where much of the precipitation is contributed in the form of dew, mist and clouds, creating a unique ecosystem not found anywhere else in the country. Indeed, Gabal Elba is a "biodiversity hotspot", with a biological diversity unparalleled in any terrestrial environment in Egypt proper. The relative abundance of moisture supports a diverse flora of some 458 plant species – almost 25% of plant species recorded for the entire country. Many Afrotropical elements have their northern limits at Gabal Elba, and the dense cover of acacias and other scrubs represents the only natural woodland in Egypt. There is at least one endemic species of plant (Biscutella elbensis).

National park
It is also known to potentially hold the last population of the Nubian wild ass. However, the purity of these animals is questionable.

On December 16, 2014 an adult male leopard was killed by a group of shepherds after it attacked their camel in Wadi Shalal, within in the region of Halaib in the extreme southeast of Egypt. This was the first sighting of a leopard in Egypt since the 1950s.

References

External links
 
 Ministry of Environment Egyptian Environmental Affairs Agency - Natural Protectorates Description 

National parks of Egypt
Elba
Elba
Territorial disputes of Egypt
Territorial disputes of Sudan
Red Sea (state)
Red Sea coastal desert
Red Sea Governorate
1986 establishments in Egypt
Protected areas established in 1986
Nature conservation in Egypt